Vulpicida pinastri is a species of foliose lichen in the family Parmeliaceae. The lichen has a greenish-yellow thallus and dorsiventral lobes. It grows on conifers and Betula in North America and Eurasia. It is the only sorediate species in the genus and is distinguished by the bright-yellow marginal soralia. The lichen, originally described by Italian naturalist Giovanni Antonio Scopoli in 1772, was transferred to the newly circumscribed genus Vulpicida by Jan-Eric Mattson and Ming-Jou Lai in 1993.

In Iceland, V. pinastri grows on downy birch stems and branches. It is found in only a few locations in the Eastern Region and is locally classified as an endangered species (EN).

References

Parmeliaceae
Lichen species
Lichens described in 1772
Lichens of Asia
Lichens of Europe
Lichens of North America
Taxa named by Giovanni Antonio Scopoli